The Italian Open (literally: Italy's Internationals), originally called the Italian International Championships, is a tennis tournament held in Rome, Italy. It is one of the most important clay tennis tournaments in the world with the men's competition being an ATP Tour Masters 1000 event on the Association of Tennis Professionals (ATP) tour, and the women's competition being a WTA 1000 event on the Women's Tennis Association (WTA) tour. The two events were combined in 2011. The tournament is played on clay courts, currently during the second week of May. The event is also known as the "Rome Masters" for male edition, as well as sponsored name "Internazionali BNL d'Italia". Rafael Nadal has won the men's singles title a record ten times.

History
The Italian tennis championship was first held in 1930 in Milan at the Tennis Club and was initiated by Count Alberto Bonacossa. The singles events at the tournament were won by Bill Tilden and Lilí Álvarez. The championships were held in Milan until 1934. The next year, 1935, the event moved to the Foro Italico in Rome. No edition was held between 1936 and 1949. The competition resumed in 1950. In 1961 the tournament was held in Turin at the Sporting Club.

The Italian Open became "open" to professional players in 1969. Between 1972 and 1989 it was a premier tournament of the Grand Prix Tennis Tour and was part of the Grand Prix Super Series top tier events. In 1990 it became an ATP Championship Series Single Week tournament, which included the nine most prestigious tournaments of the preceding Grand Prix tennis circuit. It has remained part of this category of events until today, that has changed names several times since, to be now known as the ATP Tour Masters 1000 events. 

In June 2022 ATP announced some changes to the ATP calendar for the coming year. The ATP Masters 1000 event in Rome along with those in Shanghai and in Madrid would now be held over two weeks starting in 2023, thus becoming 12 day events just like the Masters 1000 events in Indian Wells and Miami.

In 1979 the women's event was held two weeks before the men's event. The women's event was played in Perugia from 1980 though 1984 and in Taranto in 1985. No women's event was held in 1986 and it moved back to Rome again in 1987 where it has remained.

Past finals

Men's singles

Women's singles

Men's doubles

Women's doubles

Records

Source: The Tennis Base

Men's singles

Women's singles

Longest final:

Shortest fully played final:

Women's doubles

Longest final:

Shortest fully played finals:

Notes

References

External links

Official website
ATP tournament profile
Official live video website
Stadium Journey article

 
Tennis tournaments in Italy
Clay court tennis tournaments
WTA Tour
Sports competitions in Rome
Recurring sporting events established in 1930
ATP Tour Masters 1000